The Mianhuatan Dam is a concrete gravity dam on the Tingjiang River in Yongding County, Fujian Province, China. The main purpose of the dam is hydroelectric power generation and it supports a power station with 4 x 150 MW generators for a combined capacity of 600 MW. Other purposes of the dam include flood control, navigation and irrigation. Construction began in 1998 and the project was completed in June 2002.

See also 

List of power stations in China

References

Hydroelectric power stations in Fujian
Dams in China
Gravity dams
Dams completed in 2002
2002 establishments in China
Roller-compacted concrete dams